James Rae Armstrong (12 July 1887 – 10 October 1915) was a Scottish professional footballer who played in the Scottish League for Kilmarnock and St Mirren.

Personal life 
Armstrong attended Whitehill Secondary School. He enlisted as a private in the 5th Battalion of the Queen's Own Cameron Highlanders after the outbreak of the First World War in August 1914. Anderson died of wounds at 5th General Hospital, Rouen, France on 10 October 1915 and was buried in St. Sever Cemetery, Rouen.

Career statistics

References 

Scottish footballers
1915 deaths
British Army personnel of World War I
British military personnel killed in World War I
Queen's Own Cameron Highlanders soldiers
Kilmarnock F.C. players
People from Dennistoun
St Mirren F.C. players
Scottish Football League players
Association football forwards
1887 births

People educated at Whitehill Secondary School